Lorena High School is a public high school in Lorena, Texas (USA), classified as a 3A school by the UIL.  It is part of the Lorena Independent School District located in south central McLennan County.  In 2015, the school was rated "Met Standard" by the Texas Education Agency.

Athletics
The Lorena Leopards compete in these sports - 

Cross Country, Volleyball, Football, Basketball, Powerlifting, Swimming, Soccer, Golf, Tennis, Track, Softball & Baseball

State titles
Baseball - 
2003(3A)
Football - 
1987(2A), 2021(3A/D1)

State finalist
Football - 
1989(2A)

References

External links
Lorena ISD
District Map
Lorena High school Homepage

Schools in McLennan County, Texas
Public high schools in Texas